Colin Osborne (born 19 June 1975) is an English professional darts player who plays in Professional Darts Corporation (PDC) events. In 2009, he won the Championship League and reached the final of the UK Open.

Darts career
Osborne has won two PDC Pro Tour events and he also managed to hit two perfect nine-dart finishes in 2005. The first one of these came in the Players Championship in the Isle of Wight and a second one followed at the non-televised qualifying rounds for the 2005 World Matchplay.

On his World Championship debut in 2007, Osborne reached the quarter-finals where he was beaten 5–4 by Andy Jenkins.

This great performance was followed by an even better one at the 2007 UK Open, where he beat Michael van Gerwen and Mervyn King as he reached the semi-final only to be beaten 11–10 in a thriller against Vincent van der Voort. He followed this success with victory against James Wade in Las Vegas, only to lose to Peter Manley in the second round.

Osborne suffered a surprising first round exit in the 2008 World Championship, losing 3–1 to Dutchman Erwin Extercatte. In the 2008 World Matchplay, he beat King in the first round, but then lost in the next round to Phil Taylor. Osborne was 10–0 down before finally winning a leg, eventually losing 13–5 with Taylor averaging 109.

In the 2009 PDC World Championship, Osborne beat South Africa's Charles Losper 3–0 in the first round, before losing 4–1 to van der Voort in the second round.

2009 was a breakthrough year for Osborne, as he reached his first major final in the 2009 UK Open. Having beaten Raymond van Barneveld, Jamie Caven and Kevin Painter in the earlier rounds, he lost 11–6 to Taylor in the final. He also won the 2009 Championship League Darts, defeating Taylor 6–4 in the final, but a disappointing year in the other majors was compounded with a first-round loss to Simon Whitlock in the 2010 World Championship, a match that was dubbed "The Battle of the Wizards" due to both players being nicknamed 'The Wizard'.

In 2010, Osborne reached the semi-finals of the Players Championship Finals before losing to King. At the Grand Slam of Darts, Osborne lost his opening group match to Robert Thornton before beating Whitlock and Dave Chisnall to qualify for the knockout stages. He lost 10–3 to Gary Anderson in the last 16. He then reached the third round of the 2011 World Championship, and was 3–2 up against van Barneveld before losing 4–3.

Nickname
Between 2005 and 2010, Osborne was nicknamed The Wizard, a reference to The Wizard of Oz. He has long been known on the circuit, most notably by commentator Sid Waddell as Ozzy, a reference to both The Wizard of Oz and to rock singer Ozzy Osbourne. Due to the latter, he used the song "Paranoid" by Ozzy's band Black Sabbath as his walk-on. In 2011, he officially changed his nickname to 'Ozzy', following the increasing prominence of Simon Whitlock, who is also nicknamed 'The Wizard'.

Outside darts
Osborne is a former representative of the English table tennis team. He is also a former yo-yo champion and enjoys golf and snooker.

Osborne was born in Middlesbrough, but now lives in Derby with his wife Sarah. The couple have two sons, Colin Jr. (born 2003) and Alfie (born 2006). For about 18 months, Colin and Sarah were the landlords of the Greyhound pub, Village Street.

2020-now
From March 2020 until 2023 he didn't compete in any darts event.
In 2023, he took part in the MODUS Super Series.

World Championship performances

PDC

 2007: Quarter-Finals (lost to Andy Jenkins 4–5)
 2008: 1st Round (lost to Erwin Extercatte 1–3)
 2009: 2nd Round (lost to Vincent van der Voort 1–4)
 2010: 1st Round (lost to Simon Whitlock 1–3)
 2011: 3rd Round (lost to Raymond van Barneveld 3–4)
 2012: 1st Round (lost to Michael van Gerwen 1–3)
 2013: 2nd Round (lost to Simon Whitlock 0–4)
 2014: 1st Round (lost to Brendan Dolan 0–3)

PDC major finals: 2 (1 title, 1 runner-up)

Performance timeline

References

External links
 Colin Osborne profile on winmau.com (archived)
 Colins Management Team 
 Official website

Living people
1975 births
English darts players
Professional Darts Corporation former tour card holders
Sportspeople from Middlesbrough
Sportspeople from Derby
PDC premier title winners
PDC ranking title winners